The Cedrino is a river that flows in the province of Nuoro, in central-eastern Sardinia. Grazia Deledda talks about the river in various novels, including Canne al vento.

According to the historian Vittorio Angius, the name (Cedrus, Cedrinus, already mentioned by Ptolemy) derives from the luxuriant presence of cedar plants that have existed since Ancient Rome.

References

Rivers of Italy
Rivers of Sardinia
Drainage basins of the Tyrrhenian Sea